This Beautiful City is a 2007 Canadian drama film written, directed, produced, and edited by Ed Gass-Donnelly. It premiered at the 2007 Toronto International Film Festival and had a general theatrical release in 2008.

The film depicts the lives of five disparate characters in Downtown Toronto. Johnny (Aaron Poole) is a recovering crack cocaine addict trying to convince his prostitute girlfriend Pretty (Kristin Booth) to move with him to a new city so they can make a clean break from their old lives, while Harry (Noam Jenkins) and Carol (Caroline Cave) are a wealthy couple. Events are set in motion when Carol falls from the balcony of her condo in an apparent suicide attempt, landing just metres away from Johnny and Pretty in the alleyway below. She survives, but Peter (Stuart Hughes), a police detective, finds her and the group's lives begin to intertwine.

Cast
 Aaron Poole as Johnny  
 Kristin Booth as Pretty  
 Caroline Cave as Carol  
 Noam Jenkins as Harry  
 Stuart Hughes as Peter  
 Kat Germain as Zoe  
 Tony Nappo as Crack  
 Jefferson Mappin as Phil  
 Philip Akin as Police Chief  
 Christopher Cordell as Green Jacket Jock  
 Brian Frank as Steve

Soundtrack
The film's soundtrack includes songs by Bry Webb, Sunparlour Players, Buck 65, Jewish Legend and Sebastien Grainger, Andre Ethier, Shad, The Ghost Is Dancing, Emilie Mover and Dave MacKinnon.

Critical reception
On the review aggregator website Rotten Tomatoes, the film has an approval rating of 14%, based on seven reviews. Ray Bennett of The Hollywood Reporter said, "The film is contrived but powerful. A mood of underlying dread gives each scene extra tension and its gritty portrait of how urban life at all levels can ground people down is striking."

Awards and nominations
The film was nominated for four Genies at the 29th Genie Awards, including Best Actor (Poole), Best Original Song (Bry Webb, "Big Smoke"), Best Sound and Best Sound Editing.

References

External links
 This Beautiful City
 

2007 films
Canadian drama films
English-language Canadian films
Films set in Toronto
2007 drama films
2000s English-language films
Films directed by Ed Gass-Donnelly
2000s Canadian films